Corruption is the abuse of power for personal gain.

Corruption may also refer to:

Entertainment
 Corruption (1933 film), an American crime film
 Corruption (1963 film), an Italian drama film
 Corruption (1968 film), a British horror film
 Corruption (interactive fiction), a 1988 adventure game
 Metroid Prime 3: Corruption, a 2007 action-adventure game
 "Corruption", a song by Northlane from Discoveries, 2011

Other
 Corruption (linguistics), the idea that language change constitutes a degradation in quality
 Data corruption, errors in computer data
 A copying error in textual criticism
 Political corruption, corruption in politics

See also
 Corrupt (disambiguation)
 Corruptor (disambiguation)
 Kuruption!, an album by Kurupt